Myctophum lychnobium is a species of lanternfish.

References

External links

Myctophidae
Taxa named by Rolf Ling Bolin
Fish described in 1946